The Bollinger B2 was a prototype electric, dual-motor truck by Bollinger Motors, which the company hoped produce for sale. It was discontinued before it entered production. It had an announced base price of $125,000.

References 

Electric trucks
Bollinger vehicles